Ma Xiaohai is a 53-year-old computer science professor  at Nanjing Technical University under arrest for organising wife-swapping events. He was sentenced to 3.5 years in jail, "a more severe punishment because he did not admit the malicious and illegal nature of his conduct," according to the court.

In the alleged "swingers trial" in Nanjing, Jiangsu Province, he is the only one among 21 defendants to have plead "not guilty" to accusations of "group licentiousness" (聚众淫乱罪). The activities took place from 2007, and from September 2009 he was under police surveillance.

Ma was defended online by renowned Chinese sexologist Li Yinhe.

See also
Harmonious society
Sexuality in China

References

External links
 Hudong 马尧海

2010 in China
Sex and the law
Marriage, unions and partnerships in China
Crime in China
21st-century Chinese criminals
Chinese male criminals
Living people
Year of birth missing (living people)